Nazario Pagano (born 23 May 1957) is an Italian Senator from Forza Italia. He represents Abruzzo.

References 

1957 births
Living people
Senators of Legislature XVIII of Italy
University of Teramo alumni
21st-century Italian politicians
People from Abruzzo
Forza Italia (2013) senators
20th-century Italian people